St Thomas' Church, Stourbridge, is a Grade I listed parish church in the Church of England in Stourbridge.

History
The church dates from 1726. The chancel was added in 1890 by William Bidlake.

List of vicars
 Walter Hickman 1736 - 1742 
 Charles Harris 1742 - 1782 
 John Pattinson 1782 - 1808 
 Joseph Taylor 1808 - 1833 
 Giffard Wells 1833 - 1858 
 Hugh Sherrard 1858 - 1908 
 Thomas Ludovic Chavasse 1908 - 1909 
 Thomas Graham Gilling-Lax 1910 - 1911 
 Montague Stanhope Newland 1911 - 1944 
 Thomas Whitney Uniacke Keith Murrey 1944 - 1951 
 Robert Guy Pusey 1951 - 1959 
 Basil Henry Trevor-Morgan 1959 - 1976 
 Derek Leonard Barrett 1977 - 1991 
 Stephen Hutchinson 1991 - 2003 
 Ron Curtis 2005 - 2012
 Interregnum 2012 - 2015
 Andrew Sillis 2012–present

Organ
There are records of organ in the church dating from 1809 when an instrument was installed by George Pike England. There have been subsequent rebuildings and renovations over the years, resulting in a 3-manual and pedal pipe organ. A specification of the organ from 2017 can be found on the National Pipe Organ Register.

Organists
Samuel Simms 1809 - 1868 (succeeded by his son)
Samuel Simms 1868 - ???? (afterwards organist of St John's Church, Ladywood Birmingham)

References

Stourbridge
Stourbridge
William Bidlake buildings